The Fumei Suspension Bridge is a bridge in Shanmei Village, Alishan Township, Chiayi County, Taiwan.

History
The bridge was donated by the Fujian chapter of Red Cross Society of China.

Architecture
The bridge is decorated with red, blue and black of the indigenous painting of Tsou people. There is a pavilion at one end of the bridge featuring a mosaic decoration which was inspired from a myth.

Technical specifications
The bridge spans over a length of 175 meters and hanging 80 meters above the river.

See also
 List of bridges in Taiwan

References

Suspension bridges in Chiayi County
Tourist attractions in Chiayi County